The Clarksville City Arboretum is an arboretum located along the Cumberland River in Fairgrounds Park, Clarksville, Tennessee. It was certified as an arboretum in 2002, and includes over 30 species of trees.

See also
 List of botanical gardens in the United States

Geography of Clarksville, Tennessee
Arboreta in Tennessee
Botanical gardens in Tennessee
Protected areas of Montgomery County, Tennessee